USS Edison (DD-439), a , was the first ship of the United States Navy to be named for Thomas Alva Edison, an inventor and businessman who developed many important devices and received the Navy Distinguished Service Medal for his contributions to the Navy during World War I. Edison was one of the few U.S. Navy ships to be named for a civilian.

Edison was launched 23 November 1940 by Federal Shipbuilding and Drydock Company, Kearny, New Jersey sponsored by Mrs. Thomas Alva Edison, widow of the inventor; and commissioned 31 January 1941, Lieutenant Commander A. C. Murdaugh in command. Murdaugh was allowed to hand-pick the specific 5"/38 caliber gun barrels to be installed on the ship himself, but, much to his dismay, President Roosevelt personally ordered them transferred to the British cruiser .

Service history
In the months following commissioning, Edison operated on the east coast, training and exercising with the fleet, with passenger and mail runs to NS Argentia, Newfoundland. In November she escorted a convoy to Iceland, her first of many voyages which kept the lifelines open to northern bases and Britain.

In February 1942 Edison escorted Convoy ON 67 from Iceland to Halifax, Nova Scotia.  Between 21 and 25 February, Edison helped defend the convoy against three U-boat attacks.

On 24 October 1942 Edison set sail from Norfolk with a task group bound for the invasion at Fedhala, French Morocco, 8 November. She engaged shore batteries and enemy destroyers at Cape Fedhala and protected shipping lying off the beachheads during the Naval Battle of Casablanca:

Returning to Norfolk 1 December, Edison made a voyage to Gulf ports escorting tankers, then resumed safeguarding convoys from New York City and Norfolk to Casablanca and Oran.

From July 1943 to February 1944, Edison served in the Mediterranean Sea. On 10 July she provided fire support for the troops landing on Sicily to which she escorted support convoys from Algiers and Bizerte until September. She screened the assault transports in the invasion at Salerno on 9 September, and remained off the beaches to guard minesweepers and provide fire support for the advancing troops. Continuing Mediterranean escort duty, on 16 December Edison screened while  forced  to the surface with depth charges and sank it with gunfire. Edison picked up 11 survivors. On 21 January 1944 Edison arrived off Anzio to patrol during the invasion landings. She provided fire support to the beleaguered troops and escorted transports and cargo ships to the beachhead until February, then sailed home for overhaul.

Edison returned to the Mediterranean 1 May 1944 for escort and patrol off Italy. On 15 August she was in the thick of the invasion of southern France. Until the end of the year, she continued to pound shore batteries, railroads, and troop concentrations as well as patrol. At New York 17 January 1945, Edison underwent overhaul then escorted a convoy to Le Havre during April and May.

Convoys escorted

Post-war
Edison sailed inter coastal from New York 8 June 1945, and was training at Pearl Harbor when the war ended. She reached Japan in September for the occupation. She left Nagoya on 3 November to be a weather station in the Aleutians. The destroyer returned to San Francisco on 30 December, then continued to the east coast where she was placed out of commission in reserve at Charleston 18 May 1946, later in Philadelphia, where she lay at end of 1962. She was sold on 29 December 1966.

Awards
American Defense Service Medal with "FLEET" clasp
American Campaign Medal with one battle star
European-African-Middle Eastern Campaign Medal with five battle stars
Asiatic-Pacific Campaign Medal
World War II Victory Medal
Navy Occupation Medal with "ASIA" clasp

References

External links 
 
  hazegray.org: USS Edison

 

World War II destroyers of the United States
Ships built in Kearny, New Jersey
1940 ships
Gleaves-class destroyers of the United States Navy